David Bowker may refer to:

 David Bowker (sailor) (1922–2020), British sailor
 David Bowker (writer), British author and screenwriter